Butyriboletus abieticola is a pored mushroom  in the family Boletaceae. It was originally described in 1975 by mycologist Harry Delbert Thiers as a species of Boletus, but transferred in 2014 to the newly created genus Butyriboletus.

See also
List of North American boletes

References

External links

abieticola
Fungi described in 1975
Fungi of North America